John Currie (13 June 1931 – 23 February 1997) was  a former Australian rules footballer who played with Richmond in the Victorian Football League (VFL).

Notes

External links 

1931 births
1997 deaths
Australian rules footballers from Victoria (Australia)
Richmond Football Club players